The finals and the qualifying heats of the Men's 400 metres Individual Medley event at the 1997 FINA Short Course World Championships were held on Thursday 17 April 1997 in Gothenburg, Sweden.

Finals

Qualifying heats

See also
1996 Men's Olympic Games 400 m Individual Medley
1997 Men's European LC Championships 400 m Individual Medley

References
 Results

M